Wake Up Call may refer to:

 Wake-up call (service), a telephone service provided by lodging establishments

Film, radio and television
 Wakeup Call, a radio program on WBAI, New York City
 Wake Up Call (2002 TV program), a 2002–2005 American business news television program that aired on CNBC
 Wake Up Call (2014 TV series), a 2014 American reality television series hosted by Dwayne "The Rock" Johnson that aired on TNT
 "Wake Up Call" (The 4400 episode), a 2005 episode of the American science-fiction television series The 4400
 "The Wake Up Call" (The West Wing), a 2005 season 6 episode of the U.S. political drama television series The West Wing
 "Wake Up Call" (Once Upon a Time), an episode of the seventh season of Once Upon a Time

Music

Albums
 Wake-Up Call (album), a 1993 album by Petra
 Wake Up Call (John Mayall album), 1993
 Wake Up Call (Theory of a Deadman album), 2017, or the title song
 Wake Up Call, a 2019 mixtape by Yeat

Songs
 "Wake Up Call" (Maroon 5 song), 2007
 "Wake Up Call" (Phil Collins song), 2003
 "Wake Up Call" (Nothing But Thieves song), 2015
 ""Wake Up Call" (KSI song), 2020 song by KSI featuring Trippie Redd
 "Wake Up Call", a song by Hayden Panettiere
 "Wake-Up Call", a song by AFI from Very Proud of Ya
 "Wake Up Call", a song by Relient K from their self-titled debut album

See also
 Wake Up (disambiguation)